This article shows all participating team squads at the 2007 Men's European Volleyball Championship, held in Saint Petersburg and Moscow, Russia from September 6 to September 16, 2007.

Head Coach: Claudio Gewehr

Head Coach: Martin Stoev

Head Coach: Radovan Malević

Head Coach: Mauro Berruto

Head Coach: Philippe Blain

Head Coach: Stelian Moculescu

Head Coach: Alexandros Leonis

Head Coach: Gian Paolo Montali

Head Coach: Peter Blangé

The following is the Polish roster in the 2007 Men's European Volleyball Championship.

Head Coach: Vladimir Alekno

Head Coach: Igor Kolaković

Head Coach: Vladimir Pridal

Head Coach: Iztok Ksela

Head Coach: Andrea Anastasi

Head Coach: Işık Menkuer

References
Official Website

S
E